Calada is a genus of moths of the family Hepialidae. There are two described species, both endemic to Argentina.

Species
Calada fuegensis
Calada migueli

External links
Hepialidae genera

Hepialidae
Endemic fauna of Argentina
Moths of South America
Exoporia genera
Taxa named by Ebbe Nielsen